Kamran Ibrahimov (born 7 June 1999) is an Azerbaijani footballer who plays as a goalkeeper for Kapaz in the Azerbaijan Premier League.

Club career
On 15 August 2021, Ibrahimov made his debut in the Azerbaijan Premier League for Neftçi match against Zira.

References

External links
 

1999 births
Living people
Association football goalkeepers
Azerbaijan youth international footballers
Azerbaijan under-21 international footballers
Azerbaijani footballers
Azerbaijan Premier League players
Neftçi PFK players
Kapaz PFK  players